Hopeau is a surname. Notable people with the surname include:

 Fanny Hopeau (born 1945), American volleyball player
 Shandon Hopeau (born 1998), American soccer player